StubHub is an American ticket exchange and resale company. It provides services for buyers and sellers of tickets for sports, concerts, theater, and other live entertainment events. It is the world's largest ticket marketplace. While the company does not currently disclose its financials, in 2015 it had over 16 million unique visitors and nearly 10 million live events per month.

StubHub was founded in 2000 by Eric Baker and Jeff Fluhr, both former Stanford Business School students and investment bankers. In 2007, StubHub was acquired by eBay for $310 million. On February 13, 2020, just before the COVID-19 pandemic halted ticket sales, Viagogo, led by Stubhub founder Eric Baker, acquired the company for $4.05 billion.

History

2000-2007
StubHub was founded in San Francisco, United States in 2000 by Eric Baker and Jeff Fluhr, both former Stanford Business School students and investment bankers. One of its first major sports deals was with the Seattle Mariners in 2001. Baker left StubHub in 2004.

In 2005, the company raised between $10 million and $25 million from Pequot Ventures (now FirstMark Capital). That year, the company generated $50 million in revenue, was cash flow positive. and generated over $200 million in sales.
 
In the U.S., 38 states had laws allowing the reselling of event tickets as long as the sale did not take place at the event site. The other 12 states had varying degrees of regulation, including registration requirements and maximum markups. StubHub, Ticketmaster, TicketNetwork, and others began to lobby state legislatures to repeal or modify the stricter anti-scalping laws. In Florida, StubHub made over $6,500 in campaign donations to members of the state legislature in support of a 2006 bill to amend Florida's 61-year-old anti-scalping laws. Many consumers, as well as lobbyists for the leisure and entertainment industries were opposed to the bill, and claimed it would drive up prices for consumers while hurting their share of the ticket market.

The bill's sponsor argued its passage would modernize the state's ticketing industry. The bill passed in June 2006, resulting in 35 states having no restrictions on ticket resale.

In 2006, Inc. ranked StubHub as the eighth fastest growing private company in America on its annual "Inc. 500" list. In 2006, more than 100 New York Yankees season-ticket holders suspected of reselling their regular-season seats on StubHub received letters denying them the right to buy playoff tickets and barring them from buying season tickets for the 2007 season. In 2006, the New England Patriots sued StubHub to bar it from reselling the team's tickets as fans reportedly showed up at games with phony or voided tickets bought over StubHub. While some were counterfeits, others were voided tickets sold by fans after they had their season-ticket privileges revoked. On July 6, 2007, a Suffolk Superior Court judge allowed StubHub to proceed with its lawsuit against the New England Patriots. StubHub accused the Patriots of attempted monopolization, conspiracy to restrain trade, and unfair trade practices. On October 19, 2007, a court upheld an order forcing StubHub to turn over a list of all New England Patriots season ticket holders since 2002 who had used the site. The Patriots stated that they may strip the season ticket holders of their seats. On January 26, 2009, the Massachusetts Superior Court rejected StubHub's argument that it was not liable for its sellers' behavior per 47 USC 230.  NPS LLC v. StubHub, Inc., 2009 WL 995483 (Massachusetts Super. Ct. January 26, 2009).

StubHub's acquisition by eBay was announced in January 2007 for a reported $310 million. According to CNN Money, 2007 was a very successful year for the company, handling five million individual transactions, more than in the previous six years combined of its history. Staffing at StubHub had increased to 350 workers by the time of the sale. Eight months after the acquisition, StubHub reached an exclusive agreement with Major League Baseball (MLB). They get a piece of the 25% in commissions StubHub earns on either end of a season ticket buy and sell transaction. Ticketmaster filed a lawsuit against StubHub and eBay in 2007, alleging "intentional interference" with Ticketmaster's contractual rights.

2008-2013
In 2008, StubHub announced that music-related sale had seen the biggest growth and that music had become a "priority". By 2008 it had become a $5 billion a year business. It had 2.1 million visitors per month, generating over $100 million in sales annually.  In 2009, CEO Chris Tsakalakis announced that transactions on StubHub had climbed 65% from the previous year, and revenue had increased by 40%.
However, on April 10, 2009, StubHub reported that the price of second round Masters badges had declined by 43% from $1,073 in 2008 to $612 in 2009.
 
In July 2011, StubHub launched a new ticketing application, available on Microsoft Windows Phone, that makes it easier to buy tickets. StubHub applications for iPhone, iPad, BlackBerry 10, and Android also allow users to decide where they want to sit using interactive venue maps and the number of seats, and to plan the event by finding local restaurants, bars, and parking facilities. In 2012, StubHub integrated with Apple Passbook. Also in 2012, StubHub announced that Adele was the best-selling British act of 2011–2, with sales worth $35.18 million for her performances and merchandise alone.

In 2013, StubHub created an application especially for the South by Southwest events in Texas that gave users the opportunity to buy a range of tickets to all of the different shows. In 2015, StubHub sponsored a three-day lineup of bands at South by Southwest.
In January 2013, StubHub launched "The Rising Stars program", which offers grants of $25,000 - $100,000 for locally based, grassroots organizations to aid youth in sporting and artistic development. StubHub has also supported major benefit events, such as 121212, the Concert for Sandy Relief, including a $1 million donation to the Robin Hood Relief Fund for those impacted by Hurricane Sandy.
 
In December 2012, it was reported that the New York Yankees, the Los Angeles Angels, and the Chicago Cubs had dropped StubHub and declined a new five-year deal, which MLB Advanced Media had signed. The Chicago Cubs later opted back into the partnership. In March 2013, the Yankees sued StubHub, claiming that the sale of their tickets violates New York scalping laws. The Yankees claim that StubHub had opened a ticket office within 1,500 feet of Yankee Stadium, but StubHub defended itself, arguing that it wasn't a ticket sales office, but a printing station for tickets purchased online. The New York Post stated that the "Yankees are using the state's anti-scalping law to keep legal ticket reseller StubHub away from the Stadium, but when it comes to traditional illegal scalpers outside their gates, the team is giving them an intentional walk." A spokesman for the Yankees stated that there should be no double standard and that the state's anti-scalping law should be universally enforced. As of April 16, a settlement was still being reached in the Bronx Supreme Court. eBay has announced that from May 2013 it will retire some of its ticket categories on its UK website and will redirect users to the StubHub website to purchase them. They began the merging process in January 2013 when listings on StubHub also appeared in search results on the eBay UK's tickets category. In April 2013, a new pricing structure was established, and the fee will be displayed upfront without going through an auction. In May 2013, cancellation of the Spice Girls' musical Viva Forever! saw a 220% increase in online ticket searches on StubHub UK, as fans rushed to buy tickets for the remaining shows.

2014-2022
On November 4, 2014, Tsakalakis resigned from his position as president, and was replaced with Scott Cutler. In 2014, StubHub also announced the appointment of Jonah Freedman as its editor-in-chief, and has since announced plans to become a resource for finding and planning events. StubHub has also announced a plan to integrate with ESPN as part of the company's plans to offer more personalized content. As of May 2015, the site is visited by over 16 million unique visitors every month.

In September 2015, the company announced that it would no longer present inclusive ticket prices with fees and other charges included, switching to the practice where a user has the choice to have a lower price displayed at first and fees added at checkout, or fees displayed upfront. The company has also announced a commitment to give $1 million of musical instruments to U.S. schools, in partnership with The Mr. Holland's Opus Foundation.

In 2016, the United States Senate commerce committee introduced legislation called the Better Online Ticket Sales, or BOTS, Act which was later signed into law in December 2016 by President Obama. This law makes using bots to purchase tickets under certain circumstances illegal and holds bot owners liable for obtained tickets. StubHub expressed support for the legislation.

One of StubHub's top sellers (as of 2017) in the ticket reselling industry is a thirty-year-old man from Montreal, Canada, Julien Lavallée, According to a November 9, 2017 article published in The Toronto Star, Lavallée was able to expand his business using "exploitative tactics" that "gam[e] the ticket marketplace and put entertainment beyond the reach of millions of fans who can’t compete with large-scale scalping operations." The leaked documents included Lavallée's business records that showed that along with StubHub, he also used Vivid Seats and Ticketmaster as "'main channels' to scalp his tickets". Prior to October 2017, Lavallée used his company, I Want Ticket Inc, which was "registered on the British Isle of Man, to post on StubHub in the U.K."

A UK law was passed in 2017 that targeted sellers using software to purchase tickets. The Competition and Markets Authority (CMA) then sent out information requests to all four major UK platforms (Get Me In, Seatwave, Viagogo and StubHub) in August that year asking for information on sellers. When StubHub refused the request the CMA instead pursued a warrant, raiding StubHub's London office in August 2017 and confiscating records related to touts selling mass quantities of tickets. By November 2017, no charges had been laid against StubHub. According to the Toronto Star and the CBC News, Lavallée drew the attention of U.K.’s National Trading Standards (NTS) and CMA when he succeeded in controlling 310 seats for three of Adele's shows in London in 2016 for a total transaction of over $50,000 in less than a half an hour.

In late 2017, the Canadian press, using a "superscalper", Lavallée, exposed in the Paradise Papers as an example, reported that highly successful touts on StubHub were being openly incentivized for high sales volumes, arguing that StubHub was potentially incentivizing bot operators in the process.

In late 2019, StubHub disclosed having sold $4.75 billion in tickets in 2018 with $1.1 billion in annual fees, and sold tickets in 44 countries, particularly the United States. On November 25, 2019, the competing service Viagogo—which was founded by Baker and has a major presence in Europe—announced that it would acquire StubHub for $4.05 billion. Viagogo was established by Baker after he left the company. Through the merger, StubHub and Viagogo would become owned by the new entity StubHub Holdings. In February 2020, Viagogo agreed to purchase StubHub for $4 billion. In September 2021, the UK Competition & Markets Authority gave Viagogo permission to complete the acquisition. As part of the deal, StubHub agreed to sell its business outside of North America, including its UK business, to Digital Fuel Capital LLC.

In January 2022, it was reported that StubHub Holdings was considering an IPO and had filed with the U.S. Securities and Exchange Commission. In July 2022, Nayaab Islam was appointed StubHub president.

Operations
August E. Grant and Jennifer H. Meadows describe StubHub as a "clearinghouse for ticket sales." It "serves as a middleman between buyers and sellers, deriving revenue from commissions on ticket sales." Local agencies may trade smaller profit margins from selling to a larger volume reseller rather than risk not finding a retail buyer for the same ticket. StubHub, described by The Wall Street Journal as "far and away the biggest player in the $6 billion market for reselling live-event tickets", is a way for ticket sellers to gain a profit, but unlike eBay, there is no auctioning involved.

Many sell their extra tickets on StubHub at a profit, often tickets which are in high demand which are difficult to find. While concert tickets can get expensive when the demand is high, more than half of all tickets sold on StubHub go for at or below face value. Tsakalakis has stated that he believes the ticket market is not a level playing field for the average person, in that before a ticket goes on sale, promoters have already sold the vast majority of seats to everyone from fan club members, American Express card holders and ticket brokers. He has said, "There is this whole mentality within concerts that if it doesn't sell out right away it's not a hit. It just doesn't make sense. Nothing works that way. There isn't a supplier out there that says, 'The first day I put my product out there I want all of it to sell out and I don't want to have any more supply.' What business works that way?" Sellers choose what they want to charge for the ticket. A range of tickets are listed, mainly sporting, concert, theater, and other live entertainment events. Music categories are divided into Classical and Vocal, Country and Folk, Dance and Electronica, Jazz, Blues and RnB, Rock, Pop and Hip-Hop, and World and New Age music. Theatre and comedy is organized by Cirque du Soleil, Classical music and opera, dance/ballet, family, festivals and fairs, film festival, museum, musicals, play, and other/miscellaneous.
 
StubHub charges fees to both the buyer and the seller in a transaction, and the fee structure is often opaque and changes frequently. In 2014, StubHub announced "all-in" pricing, presenting the total price of the ticket to the buyer including the fees, rather than adding the fees to the end. However, in 2015 StubHub reverted to the old system of adding fees at the final stage of the transaction. In a 2020 congressional hearing on ticketing companies, StubHub's general counsel said the company's all-in pricing failed because consumers found it confusing and competitors' prices appeared lower, but said StubHub would support a federal mandate to include fees upfront. StubHub does not prohibit sellers from listing tickets for any amount, regardless of how absurd the amount might be, but posts the prices at which tickets have sold.  Ticket prices for the 2009 Super Bowl averaged $2,500. To increase delivery rate, StubHub uses Goodmail's CertifiedEmail. It promises to refund the price of any ticket that fails to reach a buyer by FedEx. StubHub and MyStoreRewards have been described as examples of "applications that leverage the PayPal platform in creative ways".

In advertising, the company has created a character known as the "Ticket Oak",  a 25-foot tall animatronic talking tree. This tree has appeared at numerous publicity events, posing for pictures and giving away thousands of tickets and prizes to fans. The Ticket Oak was phased out in the fall of 2015 as part of a larger rebrand and the launch of a new creative campaign known as "Let Your Fan Out". This was primarily due to negative audience feedback due to the Oak's unusual face and crocked eye.

In 2018, the company launched a Christmas campaign with Joseph Simmons of Run-DMC where he surprised unsuspecting customers at StubHub's New York City walk-in store with raps, as part of the company's Gift Rapper campaign.

The company faces competition from firms such as Ticketmaster, Vivid Seats and SeatGeek.

Personnel
In early 2022, StubHub Holdings had offices in Los Angeles, San Francisco, New York, Ireland, Switzerland, Taiwan, and China. StubHub Holdings employed 650 full-time people, with a third of those employees at Viagogo.

Since 2015, the Presidents and/or CEO's of the company include:
Scott Cutler - currently CEO of StockX
Sukhinder Singh Cassidy
Jill Krimmel
Eric Baker

Partnerships
The first to create the secondary ticketing sponsorship category, StubHub has become significant in sports and entertainment sponsorships and activation. In December 2015 StubHub had circa 120 partners; besides entertainment venues and sports teams, technology partners include Apple Inc, Spotify, BandPage, Amazon.com, and Uber, among others.

Sports
StubHub has become a major sponsor in sports. StubHub is active in college sports, with 35 college sponsorship deals as of April 2013, including the Universities of Texas, Michigan, and USC. Partners also include ESPN,
Tickets.com, Paciolan, IMG, and some 30 multi-use venues and festivals including Staples Center and South by Southwest. In April 2013, StubHub signed a three-year agreement with the Lawn Tennis Association which covers the Aegon events at Queens Club, London, Birmingham and Eastbourne. The agreement means that StubHub have become a brand presence on the websites of the tournaments and other forms of their marketing and communications. Also in April 2013, StubHub UK ran a competition in which if Everton F.C. fans bought their season tickets before April 19, they offered the chance to win a VIP experience for the final home game of the 2012/3 season against  West Ham United F.C., which included champagne on arrival, a three-course meal, and a tour of the dressing room by Graeme Sharp.
In May 2013, StubHub signed a three-year sponsorship deal with Jockey Club Racecourses to trade tickets on three of the racecourses in London; Sandown Park, Epsom Downs and Kempton Park.

On June 1, 2013, StubHub acquired naming rights to the home pitch of the Los Angeles Galaxy, which was renamed StubHub Center.  On May 16, 2016, the Philadelphia 76ers of the NBA announced that it had reached a three-year jersey sponsorship deal with StubHub to take effect beginning in the 2017–18 season—where the NBA will begin piloting jersey sponsorship. It marks the first time that a team belonging to any of the four major North American sports leagues has ever sold a jersey sponsorship.
 
Fans who wish to buy tickets with a team that has no relationship with StubHub may still do so - all teams, regardless of relationship (or lack thereof) may have their tickets sold there. However, if a team has no formal partnership with StubHub, electronic downloading and printing of e-tickets may not be available - such tickets can be shipped by UPS or picked up at StubHub's last-minute ticket windows. All tickets sold on StubHub are protected by the site's fan guarantee.
 
StubHub has attracted considerable criticism from sports executives. Tim Leiweke, former CEO of AEG has stated that "many sports executives hate StubHub because the company doesn't invest in the product on the court" but argues that this is misguided.

Notes

References 

Online marketplaces of the United States
American companies established in 2000
Retail companies established in 2000
Internet properties established in 2000
Companies based in San Francisco
Ticket sales companies
IOS software
Android (operating system) software
2007 mergers and acquisitions
2020 mergers and acquisitions
People named in the Paradise Papers